Kalawan (originally meaning "The caves") is the name of an archaeological site in the area of Taxila in Pakistan, where it is one of the largest Buddhist establishment. It is located about 2 km from the Dharmarajika stupa.

Kalawan has a vihara monastery, which is the largest in northern India. An inscription, recording the enshrinement of relics as a gift to the Sarvastivadin School, was found in a chaitya hall mentioning the date of "the 134th year of Azes," which corresponds to 77 CE.

Small stupas were found inside the monasteries. The Kalawan monastery, together with the Dharmarajika display an original kind of architectural arrangement in which an image shrine is built opposite the entrance. It is thought that this architectural pattern was initiated in the northwest and then became the prototype for the later development of monasteries with shrines in Devnimori, Ajanta, Aurangabad, Ellora, Nalanda, Ratnagiri and others.

References

Stupas in Pakistan
Buddhist monasteries in Pakistan
Archaeological sites in Punjab, Pakistan
Buddhist sites in Pakistan
1st-century Buddhism
1st-century religious buildings and structures